Carl Edgar Bain (January 23, 1927 – May 16, 1983) was an American pharmacist and politician who served in the Virginia House of Delegates. The only Republican elected to represent Richmond in the House in 1969 and 1971, he was defeated in 1973 by attorney Walter H. Emroch.

References

External links

1927 births
1983 deaths
Republican Party members of the Virginia House of Delegates
20th-century American politicians
Politicians from Roanoke, Virginia
Medical College of Virginia alumni